Myrsine hosakae is a species of plant in the family Primulaceae. It is endemic to the Pitcairn Islands.

References

Flora of the Pitcairn Islands
hosakae
Vulnerable plants
Taxonomy articles created by Polbot